David Milton Ebel (born June 3, 1940) is a Senior United States circuit judge of the United States Court of Appeals for the Tenth Circuit.

Education and Legal Training

Born in Wichita, Kansas, Ebel received a Bachelor of Arts degree from Northwestern University in 1962 and a Juris Doctor from the University of Michigan Law School, where he was Editor-in-Chief of the Michigan Law Review, in 1965. After law school he clerked for Justice Byron White of the United States Supreme Court from 1965 to 1966. He was in private practice in Denver, Colorado from 1966 to 1988 at the firm of Davis Graham & Stubbs. He was an adjunct professor of law at the University of Denver Law School from 1987 to 1989 and a senior lecturing fellow at Duke University Law School from 1992 to 1994.

Federal Judicial Service

Ebel was nominated by President Ronald Reagan on December 18, 1987 to a seat on the United States Court of Appeals for the Tenth Circuit vacated by Judge William Edward Doyle. Ebel was confirmed by the United States Senate on April 19, 1988, and received his commission on April 20, 1988. He assumed senior status on January 16, 2006. Neil Gorsuch, nominated on May 10, 2006, was appointed by President George W. Bush to replace him.

See also
 List of law clerks of the Supreme Court of the United States (Seat 6)

References

Sources

1940 births
20th-century American judges
Duke University School of Law faculty
Judges of the United States Court of Appeals for the Tenth Circuit
Law clerks of the Supreme Court of the United States
Living people
Northwestern University alumni
People from Wichita, Kansas
United States court of appeals judges appointed by Ronald Reagan
University of Michigan Law School alumni